Albert James Ryan (1884–1955) was a New Zealand commercial traveller, newspaper publisher, Irish nationalist and land agent. He was born in Waitahuna, South Otago, New Zealand in 1884.

References

1884 births
1955 deaths
New Zealand publishers (people)
People from Otago